The Santa Ana winds (sometimes devil winds) are strong, extremely dry downslope winds that originate inland and affect coastal Southern California and northern Baja California. They originate from cool, dry high-pressure air masses in the Great Basin.

Santa Ana winds are known for the hot, dry weather that they bring in autumn (often the hottest of the year), but they can also arise at other times of the year. They often bring the lowest relative humidities of the year to coastal Southern California, and "beautifully clear skies." These low humidities, combined with the warm, compressionally-heated air mass, plus high wind speeds, create critical fire weather conditions and fan destructive wildfires.

There are typically about ten to 25 Santa Ana wind events annually. A Santa Ana can blow from one to seven days, with an average wind event lasting three days. The longest recorded Santa Ana event was a 14-day wind in November 1957. Damage from high winds is most common along the Santa Ana River basin in Orange County, the Santa Clara River basin in Ventura and Los Angeles County, through Newhall Pass into the San Fernando Valley of Los Angeles County, and through the Cajon Pass into San Bernardino County near San Bernardino, Fontana, and Chino.

Description

Meteorology 
The Santa Anas are katabatic winds (Greek for "flowing downhill") arising in higher altitudes and blowing down towards sea level. The National Weather Service defines Santa Ana winds as "a weather condition [in southern California] in which strong, hot, dust-bearing winds descend to the Pacific Coast around Los Angeles from inland desert regions".

Santa Ana winds originate from high-pressure airmasses over the Great Basin and upper Mojave Desert. Any low-pressure area over the Pacific Ocean, off the coast of California, can change the stability of the Great Basin High, causing a pressure gradient that turns the synoptic scale winds southward down the eastern side of the Sierra Nevada and into the Southern California region. According to one meteorology journal, "a popular rule of thumb used by forecasters is to measure the difference in pressure between the Los Angeles International Airport and Las Vegas; a difference of 9 millibars (0.27 inches of mercury) is enough to support a Santa Ana event." Warm, dry air flows outward in a clockwise spiral from the high pressure center. This dry airmass sweeps across the deserts of eastern California toward the coast, and encounters the towering Transverse Ranges, which separate coastal Southern California from the deserts. The airmass, flowing from high pressure in the Great Basin to a low pressure center off the coast, takes the path of least resistance by channeling through the mountain passes to the lower coastal elevations, as the low pressure area off the coast pulls the airmass offshore. 

Mountain passes which channel these winds include the Soledad Pass, the Cajon Pass, and the San Gorgonio Pass, all well known for exaggerating Santa Anas as they are funneled through. As the wind narrows and is compressed into the passes its velocity increases dramatically, often to near-gale force or above. At the same time, as the air descends from higher elevation to lower, the temperature and barometric pressure increase adiabatically, warming about 5 °F for each 1,000 feet it descends (1 °C for each 100 m). Relative humidity decreases with the increasing temperature. The air has already been dried by orographic lift before reaching the Great Basin, as well as by subsidence from the upper atmosphere, so this additional warming often causes relative humidity to fall below 10 percent. 

The end result is a strong, warm, and very dry wind blowing out of the bottom of mountain passes into the valleys and coastal plain. These warm, dry winds, which can easily exceed , can severely exacerbate brush or forest fires, especially under drought conditions.

During Santa Ana conditions it is typically hotter along the coast than in the deserts, with the Southern California coastal region reaching some of its highest annual temperatures in autumn rather than summer. Frigid, dry arctic air from Canada tends to create the most intense Santa Ana winds.

While the Santa Anas are katabatic, they are not Föhn winds. These result from precipitation on the windward side of a mountain range which releases latent heat into the atmosphere which is then warmer on the leeward side (e.g., the Chinook or the original Föhn).

If the Santa Anas are strong, the usual day-time sea breeze may not arise, or develop weak later in the day because the strong offshore desert winds oppose the on-shore sea breeze. At night, the Santa Ana Winds merge with the land breeze blowing from land to sea and strengthen because the inland desert cools more than the ocean due to differences in the heat capacity and because there is no competing sea breeze.

Santa Ana winds are associated in the public mind with dry hot weather, but cold Santa Anas not only exist but have a strong correlation with the highest "regionally averaged" wind speeds.

Regional impacts

Santa Ana winds often bring the lowest relative humidities of the year to coastal Southern California. These low humidities, combined with the warm, compressionally-heated air mass, plus the high wind speeds, create critical fire weather conditions. The combination of wind, heat, and dryness accompanying the Santa Ana winds turns the chaparral into explosive fuel feeding the infamous wildfires for which the region is known. 

Although the winds often have a destructive nature, they have some benefits as well. They cause cold water to rise from below the surface layer of the ocean, bringing with it many nutrients that ultimately benefit local fisheries. As the winds blow over the ocean, sea surface temperatures drop about 4°C (7°F), indicating the upwelling. Chlorophyll concentrations in the surface water go from negligible, in the absence of winds, to very active at more than 1.5 milligrams per cubic meter in the presence of the winds.

Local maritime impacts
During the Santa Ana winds, large ocean waves can develop. These waves come from a northeasterly direction toward the normally sheltered sides of the Channel Islands, including commonly visited Catalina and Santa Cruz islands. Normally well-sheltered harbors and anchorages such as Avalon and Two Harbors can develop high surf and strong winds that can tear boats from their moorings. During Santa Ana conditions, it is advised that boaters moor on the Southern side of affected islands or return to the mainland.

Related phenomena

Santa Ana fog 
A Santa Ana fog is a derivative phenomenon in which a ground fog settles in coastal Southern California at the end of a Santa Ana wind episode. When Santa Ana conditions prevail, with winds in the lower two to three kilometers (1.25-1.8 miles) of the atmosphere from the north through east, the air over the coastal basin is extremely dry, and this dry air extends out over offshore waters of the Pacific Ocean. When the Santa Ana winds cease, the cool and moist marine layer may re-form rapidly over the ocean if conditions are right. The air in the marine layer becomes very moist and very low clouds or fog occurs. If wind gradients turn on-shore with enough strength, this sea fog is blown onto the coastal areas. This marks a sudden and surprising transition from the hot, dry Santa Ana conditions to cool, moist, and gray marine weather, as the Santa Ana fog can blow onshore and envelop cities in as quickly as fifteen minutes. However, a true Santa Ana fog is rare, because it requires conditions conducive to rapid re-forming of the marine layer, plus a rapid and strong reversal in wind gradients from off-shore to on-shore winds. More often, the high pressure system over the Great Basin, which caused the Santa Ana conditions in the first place, is slow to weaken or move east across the United States. In this more usual case, the Santa Ana winds cease, but warm, dry conditions under a stationary air mass continue for days or even weeks after the Santa Ana wind event ends.

A related phenomenon occurs when the Santa Ana condition is present but weak, allowing hot dry air to accumulate in the inland valleys that may not push all the way to sea level. Under these conditions auto commuters can drive from the San Fernando Valley where conditions are sunny and warm, over the low Santa Monica Mountains, to plunge into the cool cloudy air, low clouds, and fog characteristic of the marine air mass. This and the "Santa Ana fog" above constitute examples of an air inversion.

Sundowner winds 

The similar winds in the Santa Barbara and Goleta area occur most frequently in the late spring to early summer, and are strongest at sunset, or "sundown"; hence their name: sundowner. Because high pressure areas usually migrate east, changing the pressure gradient in Southern California to the northeast, it is common for "sundowner" wind events to precede Santa Ana events by a day or two.

Historical impact 
The Santa Ana winds and the accompanying raging wildfires have been a part of the ecosystem of the Los Angeles Basin for over 5,000 years, dating back to the earliest habitation of the region by the Tongva and Tataviam peoples. The Santa Ana winds have been recognized and reported in English-language records as a weather phenomenon in Southern California since at least the mid-nineteenth century. During the Mexican–American War, Commodore Robert Stockton reported that a "strange, dust-laden windstorm" arrived in the night while his troops were marching south through California in January 1847. Various episodes of hot, dry winds have been described over this history as dust storms, hurricane-force winds, and violent north-easters, damaging houses and destroying fruit orchards. Newspaper archives have many photographs of regional damage dating back to the beginnings of news reporting in Los Angeles. When the Los Angeles Basin was primarily an agricultural region, the winds were feared particularly by farmers for their potential to destroy crops.

In early December 2011, the Santa Ana winds were the strongest yet recorded. The winds toppled thousands of trees, knocking out power for over a week. Schools were closed, and a "state of emergency" was declared. The winds grounded planes at LAX, destroyed homes, and were even strong enough to snap a concrete stop light from its foundation. The winds also ripped through Mammoth Mountain and parts of Utah.

Wildfires 

Because they are simultaneous "gusty" and "desiccating," the Santa Ana winds are highly associated with regional wildfire danger. 

The winds have been implicated in some of the area's (and even the state's) largest and deadliest wildfires, including the Thomas Fire, and Cedar Fire, as well as the Laguna Fire, Old Fire, Esperanza Fire, and the Witch Creek Fire. Other major wildfires fueled by Santa Ana winds include:

 1889 Santiago Canyon Fire

 1961 Bel-Air fire
 1982 Anaheim fire

 In October 1993, the Santa Ana winds spurred a major wildfire outbreak that included the Laguna Fire and the Kinneloa Fire.

 In October 2007, the winds fueled a major wildfire outbreak in Southern California, from San Diego to Santa Barbara counties.

 In November 2008, Santa Ana winds were a factor in the Tea, Sayre, and Freeway Complex fires.
 In May 2014, Santa Ana winds initiated the May 2014 San Diego County wildfires, approximately four months after the Colby Fire in northern Los Angeles County.
 In December 2017, a cluster of twenty-five Southern California wildfires were exacerbated by long-lasting and strong Santa Ana winds.
 In September 2020, a group of wildfires in southern California were exacerbated by a mild Santa Ana event, including the Valley Fire, El Dorado Fire, and Bobcat Fire.

Health effects 
The winds carry Coccidioides immitis and Coccidioides posadasii spores into nonendemic areas, a pathogenic fungus that causes Coccidioidomycosis ("Valley Fever"). Symptomatic infection (40 percent of cases) usually presents as an influenza-like illness with fever, cough, headaches, rash, and myalgia (muscle pain). Serious complications include severe pneumonia, lung nodules, and disseminated disease, where the fungus spreads throughout the body. The disseminated form of Coccidioidomycosis can devastate the body, causing skin ulcers, abscesses, bone lesions, severe joint pain, heart inflammation, urinary tract problems, meningitis, and often death.

Name etymology 
The best-accepted explanation for the name Santa Ana winds is that it is derived from the Santa Ana Canyon in Orange County, one of the many locations where the winds blow intensely. Newspaper references to the name Santa Ana winds appear as far back as 1882. Per the Riverside Press-Enterprise in 2020:

The name Santa Ana wind became nationally known following a sensationalized 1901 wire story about wind damage. 

One narrative claimed that the term Santa Ana wind derives from a Native American phrase for "devil wind" that was then altered by Californios into the form "Satanás" (meaning Satan), and then still later corrupted into "Santa Ana". However, an authority on local Native American languages claims this supposed Indigenous term "Santana" never existed. No evidence has ever emerged to support this explanation and it is likely a false etymology.

In 1933, Father John O'Connell of Mission San Juan Capistrano reported that Don Jesus Aguilar, born 1855 at Capistrano, said that in his day the winds had been called el viento del norte.

In popular culture 
Santa Ana winds are widely believed to affect people's moods and behavior. The Santa Ana winds are commonly portrayed in fiction as being responsible for a tense, uneasy, wrathful mood among Angelenos. As The New York Times put it in 2003, "a dry, hot Santa Ana often symbolizes an unnamable menace lying just beneath the sun-shot surface of California life." According to the  book blog, the winds notably appear in Richard Henry Dana's Two Years Before the Mast, the Philip Marlowe story "Red Wind" by Raymond Chandler, Joan Didion's essays about Los Angeles, twice ("Los Angeles Notebook", and "Some Dreamers of the Golden Dream"), The Husband by Dean Koontz, White Oleander by Janet Fitch, and Less than Zero by Bret Easton Ellis. In Thomas Pynchon's 2009 "California novel" Inherent Vice the winds make an appearance and, per one scholar, "the obligatory noir description of their effects appears on page 98."

Los Angeles Times columnist David L. Ulin commented, "...for writers such as Didion and Chandler, the Santa Ana is an emblem of disruption because, for them, Los Angeles is a disrupted world. We can take issue with that impression of the city; I sometimes do and sometimes don’t. But when the Santa Ana starts to blow, I invariably grow edgy...unable, in the most concrete sense, to settle myself down."

Some of this experienced vibe shift is likely due to the very real increase of static electricity in dry conditions. California folklore therefore credits the winds with "strange luminosity in the form of sparks and glows that accompany the winds" and an excess of "positive ions, disrupting health, well-being, and temperament."

 TV references
 9-1-1 (TV series) episode "Red Flag"
 In Season 3 episode 14 of the Showtime series Weeds, Andy references the Santa Ana winds when describing how strange it is that his nephew, Shane, is talking to his dead father. He says, "Weird things happen when these Santa Ana winds start blowing."
 The Santa Ana winds are personified in The CW musical series Crazy Ex-Girlfriend as a prankster narrator responsible for main characters and enemies Rebecca and Nathaniel kissing for the first time. A song titled "Santa Ana Winds" is sung in a doo-wop style, which educates the viewer on the winds itself. The winds are portrayed by Eric Michael Roy.
Movie and music references
 Nancy Meyers movie The Holiday
 in the book White Oleander and the film of the same name
 The Return of Count Yorga (1971), winds associated with a rise in vampire activity

 Song references
 Ben Lee's single "Catch My Disease"
 Steely Dan's song "Babylon Sisters" ("here come those Santa Ana winds again")
 Belinda Carlisle song "Summer Rain"
 The Beach Boys song "Santa Ana Winds"
 The Bobs' song "Santa Ana Woman"
 Randy Newman song "I Love L.A."
 Eric Church’s song "Heart of the Night" on his album Heart
 Waylon Payne in his song "Santa Ana Winds"
 Survivor's "Santa Ana Winds" is the final track from the their 1983 album Caught in the Game
 Bruce Springsteen's song "Western Stars" from his 2019 album Western Stars
 Lagrimas' song "the devil wind" from their 2019 demo
 Modern Original and The Mowgli's song "C O O L Santa Ana" (2022)

See also

References

External links
 University of California, Los Angeles, Meteorology Dept.: Santa Ana Winds
 What are the Santana or Santa Ana Winds?
 
 University of California, San Diego, Meteorology Dept. Santa Anas (includes indicator if there are currently Santa Ana conditions)

Winds
Climate of California
Southern California
Environment of Greater Los Angeles